Mache may refer to:

Food
 Mâche, French name of the edible salad green Valerianella locusta, also known as corn salad and lamb's lettuce
 Mache (food), Filipino rice flour balls flavored with pandan

People
 Heinrich Mache, Austrian physicist
 François-Bernard Mâche, French composer
 Karl Mache, German politician

Places
 Mache District, a district of Otuzco province, Peru
 Mache River, a river that enters the Pacific in the north of Ecuador

Other
 Papier-mâché, a composite material consisting primarily of paper pieces or pulp
 Mache (unit), an obsolete unit of measurement of volumic radioactivity, named for Heinrich Mache

See also

Mach3 (disambiguation)
 Ford Mach-E, an all-electric battery-powered crossover SUV